Laco Uhrenmanufaktur GmbH (or Lacher & Co) is a German watch manufacturer, founded in 1925 in Pforzheim by Frieda Lacher and Ludwig Hummel under the name Lacher & Co.

History 

The company name derives from the surname Lacher and the abbreviation Co. At the company’s time of establishment in the mid 1920s, many other watch manufacturers in Pforzheim used almost exclusively Swiss movements. These movements were delivered either completely or in parts. Factory workers in the companies assembled the individual parts. In this way, they could save the customs duties.

Although the company had started successfully, after several years, the founders decided to go their separate ways. Hummel (*26 July 1889) stayed in the original company, the watch factory Laco, whereas Frieda Lacher joined the precision parts production for wristwatches. In 1936, Erich Lacher, Frieda Lacher’s son, had joined her business branch and finally assumed the management. For this reason, the company was renamed Erich Lacher Uhrenfabrik. Again, the firm started producing complete watches.

In 1933, Hummel founded the company Durowe (Deutsche Uhren Roh Werke), also located in Pforzheim. This factory became a world-class brand and through the sister company Lacher & Co. it developed into Pforzheim’s most popular watch producer. Like other watch manufacturers in Pforzheim, Hummel aimed at being independent from Swiss producers and at creating his own line of watches. As the wristwatch demand was slow to take off in Germany and as many factories in Pforzheim still needed raw movements from Switzerland, Hummel’s plans were difficult to implement.

Nevertheless, the company continued to grow until World War II. The number of produced movements per month increased from 20,000 to 30,000. Even during the war, Laco manufactured movements and watches. There was a particular strong demand for pilot watches. The watch models were equipped with 22-line pallet bridge movements of Durowe and they were adjusted through a chronometer with high accuracy.

Durowe didn’t supply Laco exclusively with raw movements, but also other watch manufacturers. Soon, the product portfolio included a broad range of high quality mechanisms for wristwatches. Two round mechanisms – 8 ¾ (cal. 318) and 10 ½  (cal. 410) – as well as three non-round movements – 5 ¼ (cal. 50), 7 ¾ x 11 (cal. 275) and 10 ½ – were produced. An additional “F” for „Formwerk“ distinguished them. All of these models were pallet anchor mechanisms with clutch winds – an exception at these times. Cylinder anchor and pin pallet fork mechanisms were still favoured, but full pallet fork mechanisms tended to feature ratchet winds, whose quality and design were considered to be matured.

Due to allied air raids, almost all factories were destroyed and more than 80% of Pforzheim was destroyed. Rebuilding progressed rapidly. In 1949, Laco and its sister company were put into operation again. By means of the Marshall Plan, Hummel built a 5-storey factory for Laco-Durowe, which was later extended. In the mid 1950s, 1,400 people worked there. The raw movement production rose to 80,000 per month.

The manual winding and also the automatic movements – manufactured since 1952 – contributed to Laco’s strong upturn. Durowe supplied watchmakers with an increasing number of reliable and high quality movements.

Production in Pforzheim 
The model Laco Sport included the first automatic movement of Durowe, produced since 1952: the Duromat – 11 ½ lines (cal. 552). This movement with 18,000 half oscillations and two line rotors was based on 422 cal. In 1957, the Laco chronometer with manual wind 630 (13 lines) was developed. Thereby, Laco aimed to repeat the original pilot watches’ success. It is unknown, how many Laco chronometers were produced.

Laco worldwide 
Eventually, Laco-Durowe was sold to the U.S. Time Corporation (Timex). On February 1, 1959, due to a drop of sales, Hummel sold the company to the American watch manufacturer. Timex was particularly interested in Laco-Durowe’s progresses regarding the possibilities of electric and electronic watches. The Laco-electric, the first electric German watch that functioned reliably, entered the market in 1961. Helmut Epperlein’s attempt in 1958 to bring the first electric watch on the market failed because of design mistakes. On September 1, 1965, after 6 1/2 years of ownership, Timex sold Laco-Durowe to the Swiss company Ebauches S.A.. Lacher & Co. retained its company name. The new Swiss owners wanted Durowe to produce exclusively mechanical movements for ladies’ and men’s watches. Through the German company, the Swiss company got easy access to the markets of the European Economic Community (EEC), which (since 2009) has been incorporated into the larger, more integrated European Union. Durowe remained a dominating manufacturer for another decade - in 1974, a total of 550,000 movements were produced. But as a result of the Japanese quartz revolution, Laco-Durowe, once a powerful group, fell into oblivion.

Development since the 1980s 
In the 1980s, the name Laco has been relaunched. Over the past decades, Erich Lacher Uhrenfabrik has been surviving as a small sister company. On 8 September 1988, executive manager Horst Günther acquired Laco’s name and logo rights. In this way, the company was able to fabricate a modern product range of high quality Laco watches. Most of these watches are still mechanical ones today, but function with Swiss and Japanese movements. Andreas Günther managed the company in the sixth generation.

To celebrate 75 years of the watch factory, Lacher reissued 75 of its legendary 40s-pilot-watches. 80% of the used components have been replicated from the original model. All the other components, especially the pinions and the wheel plate for the indirectly powered central second pointer, were produced in restricted amounts. The 75 limited edition watches were sold for 7,500 DM each.

As this jubilee edition was a great success, the company decided at the beginning of 2003 to launch a new series of Laco pilot watches. Five new models were available exclusively. They include artful and mechanical movements with Geneva Stripes and dyed blue screws.

New start with new owners 
For a while, Laco sailed through troubled waters and had to go into insolvency on 30 June 2009. Intensive negotiations with various companies took place. The Kienzle AG has turned out to be an unfavourable partner: For a short period of time, Laco was found under the umbrella of Kienzle Lacher Uhrenmanufaktur GmbH, but Kienzle soon went into liquidation. In spring 2010, Laco already resumed business with eight employees and has turned to its original roots: The focus should be on handcraft rather than on industry. Under new management, the pilot watches were enhanced further. Since 2010, Laco has successfully launched two dozen of new models.

Historical link to B-Watches (B-Uhren watches) 

 
During World War II, B-Watches (B for the German Beobachtung with the meaning of "observation"; in German Beobachtungsuhren, B-Uhren or B-Uhr) were produced – also known as observation watches, navigator’s watches, pilot watches or Flieger watch. Five manufacturers produced B-Watches for the German Luftwaffe:
 Lange & Söhne
 Laco (Lacher & Co)
 Stowa (Walter Storz)
 Wempe (Chronometerwerke Hamburg)
 IWC 
These watches included high-class pocket watch movements:
 Lange & Söhne: Cal. 48/1
 Laco: Durowe cal. D 5
 Stowa: Unitas cal. 2812
 Wempe: Thommen cal. 310
 IWC: Cal. 52 SC (SC = seconde central)
The Imperial Air Ministry (Reichsluftfahrtministerium – RLM) defined the specifications of these watches. On the basis of these specifications, the watches had the following features in common:

 Case diameter of 55 mm
 Engraving with FL 23883 on the case’s back and left side (FL = flight, 23 = navigation, 883 = specification by the German Research Institute for Aviation (Deutsche Versuchsanstalt für Luftfahrt))
 Large crowns, in order to be able to operate with a pair of gloves
 Hacking movement (by pulling the crown, the second hand stops / important for a precise time setting)
 Breguet balance wheel
 Regulated and tested as chronometers
 Leather strap (for easy attachment on a flight jacket’s sleeve)

See also
List of watch manufacturers
List of German watch manufacturers
Manufacture d'horlogerie

Literature 
 Michael Brückner: Auf SpUHRENsuche. Zu Besuch in innovativen Manufakturen und Ateliers. 1. Auflage. Pro Business, Berlin 2010, .
 Fritz von Osterhausen: Callweys Uhrenlexikon. Callwey, München 1999, .
 Wolfgang Pieper: Geschichte der Pforzheimer Uhrenindustrie. Verlag Dr. Klaus Piepenstock, Baden-Baden 1992,
 Konrad Knirim: Militäruhren. Die Uhren der deutschen Streitkräfte 1870 bis 1990. Verlag Peter Pomp, Bottrop 1998, .
 Konrad Knirim: Militäruhren. 150 Jahre Zeitmessung beim deutschen Militär. Verlag Peter Pomp, Bottrop 2002, .
 Helmut Kahlert, Richard Mühe, Gisbert L. Brunner: Armbanduhren. 100 Jahre Entwicklungsgeschichte. 4. Auflage. Callwey, München 1990, .

References

External links 

 The history of Laco
 German watch manufacture

Watch manufacturing companies of Germany
Watch brands
Companies based in Baden-Württemberg
Manufacturing companies established in 1925
1925 establishments in Germany
Privately held companies of Germany
German brands